The , previously the , is a Japanese international school in Dagon Township, Yangon, Burma.

The school adopted its current name on September 22, 1989 (Heisei 1).

Notes

External links

 Yangon Japanese School 
 Yangon Japanese School (yjs.fc2web.com)  (2005-2011 Archive)

Schools in Myanmar
Education in Yangon
Yangon
Japan–Myanmar relations